Said Bakkati (born 23 March 1982) is a Dutch former footballer of Moroccan descent. He was a defender who played as a rightback.

Playing career

Club
Bakkati's career began when he signed a professional contract with SC Heerenveen, making his first first-team appearance in 2000, at the age of 18. After five-and-a-half years with the team from Friesland he joined fellow Eredivisie participants ADO Den Haag during the 2005–06 season.

After playing for Go Ahead Eagles and PEC Zwolle, Bakkati ended his playing career with FC Emmen. He was then appointed trainer in the youth academy of Ajax.

Managerial career
On 13 June 2016, Bakkati was appointed as an assistant manager to Jaap Stam at English Championship side Reading. Bakkati left the club on 23 March 2018.

On 29 December 2018, Bakkati joined Dutch club PEC Zwolle as assistant manager, where he once against is assisting Jaap stam.

On 6 March 2019, it was announced that Bakkati would be joining Feyenoord as an assistant manager alongside Jaap Stam at the start of the new season.

On 21 May 2020, Bakkati joined Jaap Stam at MLS side FC Cincinnati. He was released from the club along with other assistant coach Yoann Damet in September 2021.

References

External links
 Voetbal International profile 

1982 births
ADO Den Haag players
Association football fullbacks
Dutch footballers
Dutch sportspeople of Moroccan descent
FC Emmen players
Go Ahead Eagles players
Living people
PEC Zwolle players
SC Heerenveen players
Footballers from Groningen (city)
FC Cincinnati non-playing staff
PEC Zwolle non-playing staff
Dutch expatriate sportspeople in the United States